Claude Antoine Compère (21 May 1774 – 7 September 1812) was a French officer and later general who served during the French Revolutionary and Napoleonic Wars. He was killed at the Battle of Borodino. He was the younger brother of General Louis Fursy Henri Compère.

Revolutionary Wars

Napoleonic Wars 

French generals
French Republican military leaders of the French Revolutionary Wars
French commanders of the Napoleonic Wars
1774 births
1812 deaths
Names inscribed under the Arc de Triomphe
French military personnel killed in the Napoleonic Wars
People from Châlons-en-Champagne